Detre may refer to:

László Detre (microbiologist) (1874–1939), Hungarian physician who suggested the concept of  antigens
László Detre (astronomer) (1906–1974), Hungarian astronomer
Thomas Detre (1924-2010),  Hungarian-American psychiatrist and "visionary" academic leader
1538 Detre, an asteroid named after the astronomer
Detre Bebek (14th–15th century), a palatine in the Kingdom of Hungary (:hu:Bebek Detre)
Constant Detré (1891–1945), Hungarian-French artist